Jake Kelly (born 21 January 1995) is a professional Australian rules football player who plays for the Essendon Football Club in the Australian Football League (AFL), having been initially drafted to the Adelaide Football Club. Kelly was drafted with pick 40 in the 2014 Rookie Draft, and is the son of former  player Craig.

Early life

The son of  premiership player Craig Kelly, Kelly played for the Kew Comets and the Glen Iris Gladiators, part of the Yarra Junior Football League, in his youth. He then played for his high school Scotch College, Melbourne and the Oakleigh Chargers in the TAC Cup and also made appearances for Collingwood's VFL side as a teenager. Though he wasn't originally on the list to appear at the national draft combine in 2013, he was added to the list after impressive form in the VFL. At the combine he ran the third-fastest three-kilometre time trial, finishing in 9 minutes and 51 seconds.

Collingwood had the option of nominating him as a father-son selection in the 2013 national draft, but they decided not to, instead saying they would consider selecting him as a father-son pick if he wasn't drafted in the national draft. He wasn't selected in the draft, but Collingwood chose not to select him in their list anyway, forcing him to go to the rookie draft.

AFL career

Adelaide

Rookie list (2014–2015)
Kelly started his career playing for Adelaide's reserves team in the SANFL. At the start of 2014 he was a standout in the inexperienced backline, successfully tagging several experienced SANFL forwards. This form continued through the rest of the season as he performed well, nullifying some of the competition's best forwards while averaging 16 possessions and leading the club in marks. He was second in the reserves club's best and fairest.

In early 2015, Kelly was elevated to the club's senior list, replacing the injured Brent Reilly. He made his debut against  in round 3 of the season, laying 10 tackles in the match. After playing ten games for the club, he was given a two-year contract, keeping him at the club until the end of the 2017 season. At the end of the season he was officially promoted from the club's rookie list to their senior list.

Senior list (2016–)

After suffering a hand injury, Kelly started to build form in the SANFL in 2016 and was considered a chance of replacing the injured Daniel Talia in the AFL side late in the season. He ultimately failed to play a game in 2016 due to the team's impressive defensive performances, but performed reliably in the SANFL, averaging 20 disposals and ranking near the top of the club for rebound 50s, effective kicks and marks.

For 2017, Kelly changed numbers from his old 47 to 8 after the departure of midfielder Mitch Grigg. In training for the 2017 season he again proved his endurance ability, finishing first in a 2 km time trial out of Adelaide's squad. Kelly had a chance to impress the Crows in the 2017 JLT Community Series, laying six tackles in the first match against . He again pushed for senior selection in the Crows’ final JLT Series match against , where he had 16 possessions and took seven marks. His pre-season form was enough to give him his first AFL match in 638 days in the Crows’ season opener. Kelly missed the round five match against  due to being poked in the eye in the previous game against , but his form was good enough to keep his spot in the senior side for every other match of the season. Having established himself as one of the club's most reliable defenders, conceding less than one game per goal, he was given another two-year contract extension. He played in Adelaide's losing Grand Final effort against , where he had 20 possessions and 6 marks.

Essendon

Kelly joined  as a free agent at the conclusion of the 2021 AFL season. Kelly made his debut in round 1 of his first season with the Bombers. Kelly finished 7th in the Crichton Medal, Essendon's best and fairest award, at the end of his first season with the club.

Player profile

As a junior, Kelly was a left-footed medium defender, capable of tagging both tall and small forwards and also with good rebounding skills. Early in his career, he earned the nickname “Bull” from his teammates for his competitiveness.

Kelly's endurance running is one of his greatest assets. At the draft combine in 2013 he recorded the third-fastest time in the three-kilometre time trial, and he again proved himself when he ran the fastest time in a two-kilometre time trial with ’s squad in the 2017 pre-season.

Statistics
 Statistics are correct to end of the 2022 season

|- style="background:#eaeaea;"
! scope="row" style="text-align:center" | 2015
| style="text-align:center" | 
| 47 || 10 || 0 || 1 || 62 || 47 || 109 || 37 || 31 || 0.0 || 0.1 || 6.2 || 4.7 || 10.9 || 3.7 || 3.1
|-
! scope="row" style="text-align:center" | 2017
| style="text-align:center" | 
| 8 || 24 || 0 || 0 || 182 || 174 || 356 || 104 || 66 || 0.0 || 0.0 || 7.6 || 7.3 || 14.8 || 4.3 || 2.8
|-
|- style="background:#eaeaea;"
! scope="row" style="text-align:center" | 2018
| style="text-align:center" | 
| 8 || 19 || 1 || 0 || 178 || 137 || 315 || 96 || 38 || 0.1 || 0.0 || 9.4 || 7.2 || 16.6 || 5.1 || 2.0
|-
! scope="row" style="text-align:center" | 2019
| style="text-align:center" | 
| 8 || 22 || 0 || 1 || 214 || 142 || 356 || 114 || 60 || 0.0 || 0.1 || 9.7 || 6.5 || 16.2 || 5.2 || 2.7
|-
|- style="background:#eaeaea;"
! scope="row" style="text-align:center" | 2020
| style="text-align:center" | 
| 8 || 15 || 0 || 0 || 86 || 39 || 125 || 44 || 38 || 0.0 || 0.0 || 5.7 || 2.6 || 8.3 || 2.9 || 2.5
|-
! scope="row" style="text-align:center" | 2021
| style="text-align:center" | 
| 8 || 20 || 0 || 0 || 214 || 95 || 309 || 102 || 42 || 0.0 || 0.0 || 10.7 || 4.8 || 15.5 || 5.1 || 2.1
|-
|- style="background:#eaeaea;"
! scope="row" style="text-align:center" | 2022
| style="text-align:center" | 
| 29 || 21 || 1 || 0 || 196 || 104 || 300 || 132 || 27 || 0.1 || 0.0 || 9.3 || 5.0 || 14.3 || 6.3 || 1.3
|- class="sortbottom"
! colspan=3| Career
! 131
! 2
! 2
! 1132
! 738
! 1870
! 629
! 302
! 0.0
! 0.0
! 8.6
! 5.6
! 14.3
! 4.8
! 2.3
|}

Notes

References

External links

1995 births
Living people
Adelaide Football Club players
Oakleigh Chargers players
Australian rules footballers from Victoria (Australia)
Adelaide Football Club (SANFL) players
People educated at Scotch College, Melbourne